David Regan (9 July 1939 – 25 July 1994) was a British academic who was a head of the School of Politics and International Relations at the University of Nottingham. Regan was a Francis Hill Professor of Local Government at the University of Nottingham and a member of the Bruges Group that rejected the idea of a 'federal' European Union.

Death
Regan died by suicide by carbon monoxide poisoning on the university park campus of the University of Nottingham. Regan cited his treatment at Nottingham in a suicide note.

A Service of Thanksgiving for his life was held at the Church of St Mary the Virgin, High Pavement, Nottingham on 22 October 1994. The church was full to overflowing. Tributes were paid by the Reverend Tom Irvine, The Rt. Honourable Baroness Blatch; County Councillor John Hayes, Sir Harry Djanogly, Professor Dennis Kavanagh and Rebecca Regan. What, perhaps, only became apparent after his death were quite how enormous and far reaching were his contributions to the spread of pluralist democracy and opposition to totalitarianism in every form, particularly in Eastern Europe. Equally, the fact that he quietly inspired generations of his students with his deeply held beliefs.

References

1939 births
1994 deaths
1994 suicides
British political scientists
Suicides by carbon monoxide poisoning
Academics of the University of Nottingham
Suicides in England
20th-century political scientists